Wadochowice  is a village in the administrative district of Gmina Ziębice, within Ząbkowice Śląskie County, Lower Silesian Voivodeship, in south-western Poland.

The village has a population of 260.

Until 1810, the village was a possession of the Cistercian Monastery in nearby Henryków.

References

Villages in Ząbkowice Śląskie County